Healthcare in Berkshire was the responsibility of five clinical commissioning groups until July 2022: Windsor, Ascot and Maidenhead, Slough, Bracknell and Ascot and Wokingham.

History
From 1947 to 1965 NHS services in Berkshire were managed by Oxford (the eastern side) and the North-West Metropolitan (the western side) Regional Hospital Board. In 1974 the boards were abolished and replaced by regional health authorities. Berkshire came under the Oxford RHA.  Regions were reorganised in 1994 and Berkshire came under the Anglia and Oxford Regional Health Authority.  Berkshire had two area health authorities from 1974 – Berkshire, Buckinghamshire and Berkshire, Oxfordshire. In 1982 it was divided into East and West Berkshire district health authorities.  Regional health authorities were reorganised and renamed strategic health authorities in 2002. Berkshire was part of Thames Valley SHA. In 2006 regions were again reorganised and Berkshire came under NHS South Central until that was abolished in 2013. There were two primary care trusts for the area: Berkshire West and Berkshire East.

In March 2016 Sir Andrew Morris, Chief Executive of Frimley Health NHS Foundation Trust, was appointed the leader of the Frimley Health Sustainability and transformation plan footprint, which covers the areas of Bracknell and Ascot CCG, North East Hampshire and Farnham CCG, Slough CCG, Surrey Heath CCG and Windsor, Ascot and Maidenhead CCG.  Councillors in Reading complained about the move, saying "There are those of us who can remember 30 odd years ago driving over to Oxford to try to lobby on issues to do with health.”  Buckinghamshire, Oxfordshire and Berkshire West formed a separate footprint under the leadership of  David Smith the Chief Executive of Oxfordshire CCG.

Commissioning
In 2016, the CCGs commissioned a Connected Care programme to enable the 102 GP practices, Royal Berkshire NHS Foundation Trust, Frimley Health NHS Foundation Trust, Berkshire Healthcare NHS Foundation Trust, South Central Ambulance Service and the six local authorities across the county to share records - and enable patients to view their own records.  Records of 855,000 patients are used by about 12,000 health and care professionals. The system uses CareCentric software from Graphnet.

Newbury & District, North & West Reading, South Reading and Wokingham CCGs were combined into Berkshire West CCG. They was on the basis of the Berkshire West accountable care system. Bracknell & Ascot, Slough, Windsor, Ascot & Maidenhead CCGs merged into East Berkshire CCG in April 2018. They were part of the Frimley Health accountable care system.

Primary care
There are 102 GP practices in the county.  Out-of-hours services are provided by Berkshire Healthcare NHS Foundation Trust, South Central Ambulance Service and East Berkshire Primary Care Out of Hours.

Acute services
Acute services are provided by Frimley Health NHS Foundation Trust and Royal Berkshire NHS Foundation Trust.

The county has two hospitals with accident and emergency facilities: Royal Berkshire Hospital in Reading and Wexham Park Hospital on the northern edge of Slough. Some parts of the county are closer to acute hospitals in other counties, including Frimley Park Hospital and Basingstoke and North Hampshire Hospital. The John Radcliffe Hospital in Oxford is the nearest major trauma centre to most of the county.

Mental Health and Community Services
The main NHS provider is Berkshire Healthcare NHS Foundation Trust.

Healthwatch

There are six local Healthwatches.

See also
Healthcare in the United Kingdom

References

 
Berkshire